The Primatology and Conservation programmes at Oxford Brookes University are part of the Department of Social Science, with links to the Department of Health and Life Sciences. It traces its origins to the anthropology courses offered at the then Oxford Polytechnic in the 1970s and developed into a globally recognised centre for primate conservation.

History
Oxford Brookes University began as the Oxford School of Art in 1865; as early as 1975, primatology and primate evolution was taught as part of the anthropology programme which was also available to biology and psychology students. Research in these early days had a strong focus on ecology and behaviour in particular of nocturnal primates. In 2000, the MSc in Primate Conservation was established, allowing students from all over the world to focus on the conservation of primates. In 2008, Oxford Brookes University was the recipient of the Queen's Anniversary Prize for Higher and Further Education specifically for its postgraduate degrees and training for the conservation of primates in their global habitats.

Areas of research
Over 60% of the non-human primates are threatened with extinction and 75% have declining populations. Taking a holistic view, research on primates and conservation at Oxford Brookes University centres on the primates themselves, the human that live side by side with primates, globalisation and its effect on primates, and newly emerging trends that have the potential to impede on the conservation of primates and their habitat. Research takes place both in area where primates occur naturally (Central and South America, Africa and Madagascar, Asia, Europe) as well as in captive settings.

The programme has strong links with (primate) conservation programmes in various parts of the world, including Neotropical Primate Conservation , Entropica , Monitor Conservation Research Society (Monitor) , Moroccan Primate Conservation Foundation , Orangutan Information Centre  and Project Anoulak

Teaching programmes
Primatology and conservation is taught as part of the BSc/BA in Anthropology and Biological Anthropology; BSc Animal Biology and Conservation; the postgraduate diploma in Anthropology; the MSc in Conservation Ecology; the MSc in Primate Conservation; the MRes in Primatology and Conservation.

Doctoral research takes place in the School of Social Sciences and the Department of Biological and Medical Sciences.

New species 
Several new species of primate, and one new genus, have been described by researchers working in the Primate Conservation programme, including

 Kayan Slow Loris Nycticebus kayan, Munds, Nekaris & Ford, 2013
 Mount Kenya Potto Perodicticus potto stockleyi Butynski & De Jong, 2007
 Rondo Dwarf Galago Galagoides rondoensis Honess in Kingdon, 1997
 Udzungwa Dwarf Galago Galagoides zanzibaricus udzungwensis Honess in Kingdon, 1997
 Makandé Squirrel Galago Sciurocheirus makandensis Ambrose, 2013
 Angolan Dwarf Galago Galagoides kumbirensis Svensson, Bersacola, Mills, Munds, Nijman, Perkin, Masters, Couette, Nekaris & Bearder, 2017

 Pygmy loris Xanthonycticebus Nekaris & Nijman, 2022
Description and resurrection  of

Northern pygmy loris Xanthonycticebus intermedius (Dao Van Tien, 1960)
 Southern pygmy loris Xanthonycticebus pygmaeus (Bonhote, 1907)

Research groups
The Nocturnal Primate Research Group
The Oxford Wildlife Trade Research Group

In 2021, by subjects, Oxford Brookes University ranks 128 (Social Sciences and Management, QS World University Rankings), 201-250 (Life Sciences, Times Higher Education World University Rankings), 301-400 (Biological Sciences, Shanghai Global Rankings of Academic Subjects), 301-400 (Social Sciences, Times Higher Education), and 551-600 (Biological Sciences, QS).

Honorary doctorates
Several prominent conservationists and primatologist have received honorary doctorates from Oxford Brookes University, including
Sir David Attenborough (2003)   
Charlotte Uhlenbroek (2007), HonDSci
Ian Redmond, OBE (2011), HonDSci
Alison Cronin, MBE (2018), HonDSci

References

Oxford Brookes University